The wattled honeyeaters make up a genus (Foulehaio) of birds in the family Meliphagidae. 

It contains the following species:

 
Taxa named by Ludwig Reichenbach